Max Poon Pui Hin (born 3 October 2000) is a Hong Kong professional footballer who currently plays for Hong Kong Premier League club Kitchee.

Club career
On 6 May 2017, Poon made his HKPL debut for Biu Chun Glory Sky in the match against Tai Po at the age of 16.

On 11 August 2021, Poon signed for Kitchee. He was a core member in Sapling Cup during 21/22 season, he only made 1 league appearance during his first season at the club. He established himself as a first team regular in 22/23 season, scoring 3 goals in 2 premier league appearances.

Career statistics

Club

Notes

References

External links
 
 Poon Pui Hin at HKFA
 

Living people
2000 births
Hong Kong footballers
Association football midfielders
Association football defenders
Hong Kong Premier League players
Hong Kong First Division League players
Hong Kong Rangers FC players
Dreams Sports Club players
South China AA players
Happy Valley AA players
Kitchee SC players